Kowloon Urban Route No. 20 is a Hong Kong bus route operated by Citybus, plying between Kai Tak (Muk Ning Street) and Tai Kok Tsui (Island Harbourview).

This route was introduced in April 2018 in conjunction with population intake in the Kai Tak Development. It is the first intra-Kowloon franchised bus route operated by Citybus, which obtained the right to operate this route through a tendering exercise.

History
Population growth in the Kai Tak Development Area, which was redeveloped from the former Hong Kong International Airport, resulted in increased travelling demand to and from the district. Transport Department thus proposed the introduction of three new bus route serving the new development in the Bus Route Planning Programme 2017-2018. It was envisaged that the one serving between Kai Tak and Island Harbourview in Tai Kok Tsui would improve the linkage between the areas of Tai Kok Tsui, Yau Ma Tei, Argyle Street and Kai Tak.

The Transport Department invited franchised bus companies to submit proposals on operating the three routes. In April 2018 Citybus was announced as the successful tenderer of these three routes. The route thus has the significance of being the first intra-Kowloon franchised bus route ever operated by Citybus.

The route, numbered 20, commenced service on 29 April 2018, the first among the three routes being tendered.

On 1 August 2018, a sewing needle was found sticking out of a lower-deck seat on a route 20 bus. This incident formed part of a string of incidents involving needles or sharp implements being planted on seats on Hong Kong buses, which sparked panic among passengers.

Route
Route 20 operates via these primary locations:

 Tai Kok Tsui (Island Harbourview)
 Olympic station / Olympian City
 Charming Garden
 Yau Ma Tei Fruit Market
 Yau Ma Tei station
 Kwong Wah Hospital
 Kowloon Hospital
 Kowloon City
 Prince Edward Road East
 Kai Ching Estate
 Tak Long Estate
 Kai Tak (Muk Ning Street)

See also
 List of bus routes in Hong Kong

References

External links
 Route 20 information on Citybus/NWFB website
 Kai Tak bound
 Tai Kok Tsui bound

Bus routes in Hong Kong